Kolmogorov forward equations may refer to:
 Kolmogorov equations (Markov jump process), relating to discrete processes 
 Fokker–Planck equation, relating to diffusion processes